RockNess 2006 was the first RockNess festival to take place. Fatboy Slim took his 'Brighton Beach Party' to the shores of Loch Ness to create the first festival which was held on Saturday 24 June 2006. All of the 20,000 tickets were sold at price of £32.50.

The festival had two stages, a main stage and big top, which were active throughout the day. It started at midday and both stages hosted different dance acts about every hour and a half. Acts included X-Press 2, Stanton Warriors, Scratch Perverts, Linus Loves, Cagedbaby, Audio Bullys, Slam, Mylo, Carl Cox with Fatboy Slim headlining.

References

RockNess
2006 in Scotland
2006 in British music
2006 music festivals
June 2006 events in the United Kingdom